Lê Khả Phiêu (27 December 1931 – 7 August 2020) was a Vietnamese politician who served as General Secretary of the Communist Party of Vietnam from December 1997 to April 2001. Lê Khả Phiêu served in the Vietnam People's Army during the First and Second Indochina Wars, join in the Cambodian war, and was Head of the General Political Department of the Vietnam People's Army.

Lê Khả Phiêu has previously been viewed as a conservative. However, this categorization has been challenged by historian Martin Gainsborough, who notes that Lê Khả Phiêu made some remarkably outspoken comments about problems in the party before the Tenth Party Congress. Lê Khả Phiêu criticized what he called 'illness of partyization' (bệnh đảng hoá), meaning that the Party controls everything. Lê Khả Phiêu was a protégé of his predecessor, Đỗ Mười. He was elevated to the Politburo in the early 1990s.

Early life
Lê Khả Phiêu was born on 27 December 1931 in Thượng Phúc village in Đông Khê District in Thanh Hoa Province. In 1945, he joined the local Viet Minh movement and joined the Indochinese Communist Party on 19 June 1949.

On 1 May 1950 he was sent by the Viet Minh to join the army. He was promoted to second lieutenant, advancing to the position of Company Politician in the 66th Regiment of the 304th Division. From September 1954 to 1958, he held the post of Deputy Political Officer member of the battalion and then 66th Regimental Political Chair.

Death 
Lê Khả Phiêu died on 7 August 2020 in Hanoi, after suffering from serious illness, at the age of 88.

A 2-day mourning period for his death was decreed nationwide in Vietnam from 14 to 15 August 2020. He was buried at Mai Dịch Cemetery in Hanoi.

References

References
 Bolton, Kent (1999): "Domestic Sources of Vietnam's Foreign Policy: Normalizing Relations with the United States". in Thayer, Carlyle A., Amer, Ramses (ed.): Vietnamese Foreign Policy in Transition. Institute of Southeast Asian Studies, Singapore
 Gainsborough, Martin (2010): Vietnam – Rethinking the State. Zed Books, London & New York

External links
 Vietnam Entering the 21st Century, a 2001 collection of his works in PDF format

1931 births
2020 deaths
General Secretaries of the Central Committee of the Communist Party of Vietnam
Members of the 7th Politburo of the Communist Party of Vietnam
Members of the 8th Politburo of the Communist Party of Vietnam
Members of the Standing Committee of the 8th Politburo of the Communist Party of Vietnam
Members of the 7th Secretariat of the Communist Party of Vietnam
Members of the 7th Central Committee of the Communist Party of Vietnam
Members of the 8th Central Committee of the Communist Party of Vietnam
People from Thanh Hóa province